Murray Ian Wallace (13 October 1967, Milton of Campsie, East Dunbartonshire, was a Scottish international rugby union player, who played for . He was capped three times between 1996 and 1997.

References

1967 births
Living people
Glasgow District (rugby union) players
Glasgow High Kelvinside RFC players
Glasgow Warriors players
People from Milton of Campsie
Rugby union flankers
Rugby union players from East Dunbartonshire
Scotland international rugby union players
Scottish rugby union players